Calonne-sur-la-Lys (literally Calonne on the Lys) is a commune in the Pas-de-Calais department in the Hauts-de-France region of France.

Geography

Population

Places of interest
 The church of St.Omer, dating from the twentieth century.
 The Commonwealth War Graves Commission cemetery.

Notable people
 Robert Gaguin, humanist, was born here in 1433.

See also
 Communes of the Pas-de-Calais department

References

External links

 The CWGC graves at Calonne communal cemetery

Calonnesurlalys